Anaissini is a tribe of click beetles in the family Elateridae.

Genera
 Agnostelater Costa, 1975
 Alampoides Schwarz, 1906
 Anaissus Candèze, 1857
 Coctilelater Costa, 1975
 Peralampes Johnson, 2002

References

Elateridae
Beetle tribes